Randolphville is an unincorporated community located within Piscataway Township in Middlesex County, New Jersey, United States. It is the location of the historic Randolphville Bridge.

References

Piscataway, New Jersey
Unincorporated communities in Middlesex County, New Jersey
Unincorporated communities in New Jersey